The 1999 All-Ireland Minor Hurling Championship was the 69th staging of the All-Ireland Minor Hurling Championship since its establishment by the Gaelic Athletic Association in 1928. The championship began on 24 April 1999 and ended on 12 September 1999.

Cork entered the championship as the defending champions, however, they were beaten by Clare in the Munster semi-final.

On 12 September 1999, Galway won the championship following a 0-13 to 0-10 defeat of Tipperary in the All-Ireland final. This was their fourth All-Ireland title overall and their first title in 1994.

Tipperary's Eoin Kelly was the championship's top scorer with 1-21.

Results

Leinster Minor Hurling Championship

Group stage

Semi-finals

Finals

Munster Minor Hurling Championship

First round

Semi-finals

Final

Ulster Minor Hurling Championship

Semi-finals

Final

All-Ireland Minor Hurling Championship

Quarter-finals

Semi-finals

Final

Championship statistics

Top scorers

Top scorer overall

Top scorers in a single game

External links
 All-Ireland Minor Hurling Championship: Roll Of Honour

Minor
All-Ireland Minor Hurling Championship